Mary Vingoe is a Canadian playwright, actor, and theatre director. Vingoe was one of the co-founders of Canadian feminist theatre company Nightwood Theatre and later co-founded Ship's Company Theatre in Parrsboro and Eastern Front Theatre in Halifax. From 2002 to 2007, Vingoe was artistic director of the Magnetic North Theatre Festival. Vingoe is an Officer of the Order of Canada and received the Portia White Prize. Her play Refuge was a shortlisted nominee for the Governor General's Award for English-language drama at the 2016 Governor General's Awards.

Early life 
Originally from Dartmouth, Nova Scotia, Vingoe studied theatre at Dalhousie University in Halifax. She graduated with a bachelor of arts (honours) from Dalhousie in 1976 and was awarded the University Medal in Theatre. Vingoe later attended the University of Toronto's Graduate Centre for Study of Drama.

Career 
Vingoe co-founded Toronto's Nightwood Theatre in 1979 with Cynthia Grant, Kim Renders, and Maureen White. Vingoe was the only founding member of Nightwood to be an Equity member at the time of founding. Vingoe served as Nightwood's first artistic coordinator from 1985, when Cynthia Grant left the collective, until 1987.  The position was created to fulfill the same responsibilities as an artistic director but with a title that better suited Nightwood's origins as a collective.   

Vingoe helped to collectively create works with other Nightwood collaborators, including 1979's The True Story of Ida Johnson and 1981's The Yellow Wallpaper. She acted in shows such as The Yellow Wallpaper (1981) and Pope Joan (1984).Vingoe also directed several plays while working with Nightwood, including Love and Work Enough (1984), Sally Clark's St. Francis of Hollywood (1987), Margaret Hollingsworth's War Babies (1985 and 1987), and The Herring Gull's Egg (1987), which she also wrote. Nightwood re-staged The Herring Gull's Egg in 1989 as directed by Maureen White.

In 1984, Vingoe co-founded Ship's Company Theatre in Parrsboro, Nova Scotia with Michael Fuller. Their first production, You’ll be in Her Arms by Midnight and Other Parrsboro Stories, was performed on the M.V. Kipawo ferry. With Ship's Company, Vingoe has directed several plays including Wendy Lill's The Glace Bay Miner's Museum. Vingoe directed The Glace Bay Miner's Museum again in 2012 for the National Arts Centre's English Theatre Company and served as an assistant director on the 1995 film adaptation of the play, Margaret's Museum.

In 1993, Vingoe co-founded Eastern Front Theatre in Halifax with Wendi Lill and Gay Hauser. In 2002, Vingoe directed a production of The Drawer Boy with EFT for which she was nominated for a Merritt Award for Outstanding Direction. 

In 2002, Vingoe was appointed the first artistic director of the Magnetic North Theatre Festival, a festival celebrating Canadian English-language theatre. She stepped down from the position after the 2007 Magnetic North Festival.

In 2010, Vingoe directed the world premiere of Colleen Wagner's play Home at the Bus Stop Theatre in Halifax. The two founded HomeFirst Theatre that year with the intention of producing plays written by Atlantic Canadians. HomeFirst Theatre has since put on such plays as Wendy Lill's Messenger in 2015 with Neptune Theatre and the premiere of Vingoe's play Refuge in 2013 with Eastern Front Theatre.

Vingoe portrayed Wanda Greyson in the CBC radio drama Backbencher. Vingoe directed Alden by Richard Merrill, a play about poet Alden Nowlan at the 2011 NotaBle Acts Theatre Festival in Fredericton, New Brunswick. During Neptune Theatre's 2014/15 season as part of the Open Spaces program with Theatre Nova Scotia, Vingoe directed the Atlantic Canadian premiere of Catherine Banks' It Is Solved by Walking.

In 2018, Vingoe directed the musical Urinetown as part of Chester Playhouse's summer festival in Chester, Nova Scotia. Vingoe wrote the play Some Blow Flutes and directed its 2018 premiere at the Bus Stop Theatre.

Politics 
In 2013, Vingoe ran for public office. She ran as the NDP candidate for Dartmouth South in the Nova Scotia provincial election but lost with 33.3% of the vote.

|-

|align="right"| 4,049
|align="right"| 46.24
|align="right"| +18.34
|-
 
|New Democratic Party
|Mary Vingoe
|align="right"| 2,918
|align="right"| 33.32
|align="right"| -22.24

|-
 
|Progressive Conservative
|Gord Gamble
|align="right"| 1,612
|align="right"| 18.41
|align="right"| +5.16
|-

|align="right"| 178
|align="right"| 2.03
|align="right"|  
|}

Personal life 

Vingoe was married to jazz musician Paul Cram who, before his death in 2018, worked as a sound designer on some of Vingoe's productions.  The two have two children, Laura and Kyle Vingoe-Cram.

Plays

Ten Seconds After Closing 
Ten Seconds After Closing premiered with Nightwood Theatre in 1980 under the direction of Cynthia Grant.

Holy Ghosters
Holy Ghosters is a historical drama set in the eighteenth century and features a non-linear structure. The play premiered 1983 at the Mulgrave Road Co-Op Theatre as directed by Jan Kudelka. A revised version of Holy Ghosters was performed Mount Allison University's Windsor Theatre in 1986.

Hooligans
Hooligans was co-written by Vingoe and Jan Kudelka with contributions from Ian A. Black, Jay Bowen, Cynthia Grant, Irene Pauzer, Kim Renders, Linda Stephen, Bruce Vavrina, and inspired by an idea from Pauzer. The play uses text from the diaries of Isadora Duncan, Edward Gordon Craig, Sergei Esenin, Kathleen Bruce, and Robert Falcon Scott. Hooligans premiered with Nightwood Theatre in March 1982.

The Herring Gull's Egg 
In November 1987, Vingoe directed the premiere of her play The Herring Gull's Egg with Nightwood Theatre as part of the 3rd Groundswell Festival. The play received dramaturgy from Maureen Labonte. Nightwood re-staged The Herring Gull's Egg in 1989 under the direction of Maureen White.

The Company Store 
Vingoe based her play The Company Store on the Sheldon Currie novel of the same name. The play premiered in 1996 at the Mulgrave Road Theatre Co-Op in Guysborough, Nova Scotia.

Living Curiosities: Or What You Will 
Living Curiosities was inspired by the 'giantess' Anna Swan. The play is set in 1963 and follows Anna and other 'curiosities' in P. T. Barnum's show as they put on a production of Twelfth Night. Living Curiosities was workshopped at Word Festival! in Toronto in 1991 and then premiered in January 1992 with Anne-Marie MacDonald as Anna Swan. A revised version of Living Curiosities premiered in 2015 with Theatre Erindale in Mississauga, Ontario.

Refuge 
Refuge uses actual text from a CBC radio documentary in addition to fictive additions to tell the story of an Eritrean man seeking refugee status in Canada. The play premiered with Eastern Front Theatre and HomeFirst Theatre in 2013 and was subsequently staged by Nightwood Theatre in 2016. In 2014, Refuge was nominated for Outstanding Play by a Nova Scotian Playwright the Merritt Awards. Refuge was a finalist for the 2014 Lieutenant Governor of Nova Scotia Masterworks Astounding Art Awards. Refuge was also nominated for the Governor General's Award for English-language drama in 2016.

Some Blow Flutes 
Some Blow Flutes premiered with HomeFirst Theatre at the Bus Stop Theatre in Halifax in 2018. The play follows a teenage girl caring for her grandmother who has dementia. Some Blow Flutes was nominated for Outstanding New Play by a Nova Scotian at the 2019 Merritt Awards.

Awards and recognitions 

Vingoe was named an Officer of the Order of Canada in 2010.

References 

21st-century Canadian dramatists and playwrights
Canadian women dramatists and playwrights
Canadian theatre directors
Canadian radio writers
Women radio writers
People from Dartmouth, Nova Scotia
Writers from Halifax, Nova Scotia
Dalhousie University alumni
University of Toronto alumni
Officers of the Order of Canada
Living people
21st-century Canadian women writers
Canadian Film Centre alumni
Candidates in Nova Scotia provincial elections
Women in Nova Scotia politics
Canadian artistic directors
Year of birth missing (living people)